Andrew Green or Andy Green may refer to:
Andrew Green, Baron Green of Deddington (born 1941), former British diplomat and anti-immigration activist
Andrew Green (Formula One), Formula One engineer
Andrew Green (ghost hunter) (1927–2004), British ghost hunter
Andrew Green (Jersey politician), Deputy for St Helier 3 & 4 District, Jersey
Andrew Green (librarian), Welsh librarian
Andrew Green (MP) for Dunwich (UK Parliament constituency)
Andrew Haswell Green (1820–1903), American civic leader
Andy Green (RAF officer) (born 1962), British land speed record driver
Andy Green (baseball) (born 1977), American baseball player and manager
Andy Green (boxer) (born 1970), English boxer
Andy Green (darts player), American former darts player

See also
Andrew Greene (born 1969), Canadian Football League offensive tackle
Andy Greene (born 1982), American ice hockey